Marsden A was a 250 MW oil-fired power station near the Marsden Point Oil Refinery at Marsden Point, Ruakaka, Northland, New Zealand. It was built between 1964 and 1966 and commissioned in 1967. It acted as an emergency reserve power station, serving the load centre of Auckland to the south. It was cooled through a long seawater pipe out into Bream Bay, which is now used to supply an aquaculture industry nearby.

Following the commissioning of the dual coal- and gas-fired Huntly power station in 1982, Marsden A became less used, and it was mothballed in the 1990s due to rising oil prices. One of the generators was subsequently run as a synchronous condenser to provide reactive power support to Transpower's national grid in Northland, but were decommissioned in 2007 when they were superseded by solid state power support devices within Transpower's network.

The facility was latterly owned and operated by Mighty River Power.

See also
Marsden B

References

Oil-fired power stations in New Zealand
Buildings and structures in the Northland Region
Whangarei District